Samy Bourard (born 29 March 1996) is a Belgian professional footballer who plays for Israeli club Hapoel Hadera. He formerly played for ADO Den Haag, Fehérvár FC, FC Eindhoven and Sint-Truiden.

Club career

Sint-Truiden
He made his Belgian First Division A debut for Sint-Truiden on 4 November 2017 in a game against Eupen.

ADO Den Haag
He made his Eredivisie debut against Heracles. He played 19 games for ADO Den Haag and scored 3 times. He had a fantastic game against AFC Ajax with 1 goal and 1 beautiful assist.

Fehérvár
On 9 February 2021, he was signed by three time Hungarian League champions Fehérvár FC.

Return to ADO Den Haag
On 31 August 2021, he returned to ADO Den Haag for the 2021–22 season.

International career
Born in Belgium, Bourard is of Moroccan descent. He is a former youth international for Belgium.

References

External links
 
 
 

1996 births
Living people
Belgian footballers
Association football midfielders
Belgium youth international footballers
Belgian sportspeople of Moroccan descent
Sint-Truidense V.V. players
FC Eindhoven players
ADO Den Haag players
Fehérvár FC players
Hapoel Hadera F.C. players
Belgian Pro League players
Eredivisie players
Eerste Divisie players
Nemzeti Bajnokság I players
Israeli Premier League players
Belgian expatriate footballers
Expatriate footballers in the Netherlands
Expatriate footballers in Hungary
Expatriate footballers in Israel
Belgian expatriate sportspeople in the Netherlands
Belgian expatriate sportspeople in Hungary
Belgian expatriate sportspeople in Israel